The seventh series of the British comedy-drama television series Cold Feet began broadcasting on the ITV network on 8 September 2017. There will be seven episodes and it is the second full series of Cold Feet since 2003 since it was revived in 2016.

Cast

Main
 James Nesbitt as Adam Williams
 Robert Bathurst as David Marsden
 Hermione Norris as Karen Marsden
 John Thomson as Pete Gifford
 Fay Ripley as Jenny Gifford
 Leanne Best as Tina Reynolds
 Ceallach Spellman as Matt Williams

Supporting
 Jacey Salles as Ramona Ramirez
 Daisy Edgar-Jones as Olivia Marsden
 Ella Hunt as Ellie Marsden
 Jack Harper as Adam Gifford
 Madeleine Edmondson as Chloe Gifford
 Siobhan Finneran as Nikki Kirkbright
 Robert Glenister as George Kirkbright 
 Paul Ritter as Benjamin Stevens
 Lucy Robinson as Robyn Duff
 Amy Huberman as Sarah Poynter
 Alastair Mackenzie as Jamie Poynter
Ruth Madeley as Tracey McHarrie
 Shannon Hayes as Bridie Sellers
 Marji Campi as Barbara Blyth
 Sally Rogers as Sheila Blyth
 Eileen O'Brien as Vera Goulbourne
 Ziggy Heath as Luke Harris
 Faith Alabi as Eliza Schumacher
 Aaron Cobham as Jules Watson
Izabella Malewska as Receptionist

Guest
 Peter Jones, Deborah Meaden, Touker Suleyman, Jenny Campbell, and Tej Lalvani as themselves

Episodes

Production
On 17 October 2016, ITV renewed Cold Feet for a seventh series consisting of seven episodes, following a positive response of sixth series from television critics and viewers. Filming for the series began in March 2017 in Manchester, and concluded on 30 June 2017. It was announced on 15 August 2017, that Siobhan Finneran had joined the cast of the upcoming series. The series will begin airing from 8 September. In episode 6, The Dragons from the BBC television series Dragons' Den appeared as themselves in a dream sequence.

References

External links 
 

2017 British television seasons